Aminopeptidase I (aminopeptidase III, aminopeptidase yscI, leucine aminopeptidase IV, yeast aminopeptidase I) is an enzyme. This enzyme catalyses the following chemical reaction

 Release of an N-terminal amino acid, preferably a neutral or hydrophobic one, from a polypeptide.

Aminoacyl-arylamides are poor substrates

References

External links 
 

EC 3.4.11